Jan Willem Boudewijn Gunning (3 September 1860 in Hilversum, North Holland – 26 June 1913 in Pretoria), was a Dutch physician, who served as the director of both the Staatsmuseum and what was then known as the Pretoria Zoological Gardens (now the National Zoological Gardens of South Africa).

Gunning was the second son of the famous Dutch theologian Johannes Hermanus Gunning (1829-1905) and Johanna Jacoba Gunning. He attended the University of Amsterdam, Leiden University and Jena University, qualifying as a doctor of medicine. In 1884 he emigrated to South Africa and started a practice in the Orange Free State. The same year, he met and married Susanna Neethling (26 April 1862 - 14 May 1889) on 10 November 1884. From the Free State, he moved to the Cape Colony and practised there until 1897 when he was appointed as first director of the Staatsmuseum (State Museum) in Pretoria, which later was renamed the Transvaal Museum. He remained director until his death in 1913. Gunning was responsible for founding the National Zoo in Pretoria in 1899.

While Winston Churchill was imprisoned in Pretoria during the Boer War, he became well acquainted with Gunning, who was one of the directors of the prison. Of him, he said:

 
Capt. Aylmer Haldane, another prisoner in the facility had the following to say:

On the death of his first wife, he married Ellen Elizabeth Dobbin (born 30 December 1867) of Bethulie on 19 November 1889. She was the daughter of William Rouse Dobbin and Emma Elizabeth Kirkham.

He compiled A Checklist of the Birds of South Africa with Alwin Karl Haagner in 1910. The bird species Sheppardia gunningi, also called east coast akalat or Gunning's akelat, is named for him.

Notes and references

External links

Johannes Hermanus Gunning
Johannes Willem Gunning

1860 births
1913 deaths
Dutch emigrants to South Africa
19th-century Dutch physicians
People from Hilversum
South African museologists
South African ornithologists
South African zoologists